Calypso Joe is a 1957 American musical film directed by Edward Dein and written by Edward Dein and Mildred Dein. The film stars Herb Jeffries, Angie Dickinson, Ed Kemmer, Stephen Bekassy, Laurie Mitchell and Claudia Drake. The film was released on June 9, 1957, by Allied Artists Pictures.

Plot

Cast          
Herb Jeffries as Calypso Joe
Angie Dickinson as Julie
Ed Kemmer as Lee Darling 
Stephen Bekassy as Rico Vargas
Laurie Mitchell as Leah
Claudia Drake as Astra Vargas
Murray Alper as Transfer Man
Linda Terrace as Lady T
Charles Keane as Pilot
Genie Stone as Television Actress
Robert Sherman as Co-Pilot
Lord Flea as himself
Duke of Iron (Cecil Anderson) as himself

References

External links
 

1957 films
American musical films
1957 musical films
Allied Artists films
1950s English-language films
Films directed by Edward Dein
1950s American films